The men's tournament in ice hockey at the 2006 Winter Olympics was held in Turin, Italy, from 15 to 26 February. Twelve teams competed, with Sweden winning the gold medal, Finland winning silver, and the Czech Republic winning bronze. It was the third Olympic tournament to feature National Hockey League (NHL) players and the tenth best-on-best hockey tournament in history. United States defenseman Chris Chelios set a standard for longest time between his first Olympic ice hockey tournament and his last—he had competed twenty-two years earlier at the 1984 Olympics. The old record was set by Swiss hockey player Bibi Torriani. who had played twenty years after his debut (1928 and 1948).

The tournament format was changed from the 1998 and 2002 tournaments to a format similar to the 1992 and 1994 tournaments. The number of teams was reduced from 14 to 12, which were split into two groups in the preliminary stage (which followed a round robin format). Each team played the other teams in their group once. The top four teams from each group advanced to the quarter-finals.

The tournament is also notable for the lacklustre performance of defending champion Canada, which lost two group stage games (including a shock defeat to Switzerland) before being eliminated by Russia in the quarter-finals. There were allegations that Sweden intentionally lost their final group game against Slovakia to set up a quarterfinal against Switzerland.

In the semi-finals, Sweden defeated the Czech Republic 7–3, and Finland ousted Russia 4–0. Sweden won its second ice hockey gold, and first in a best-on-best competition, over Finland 3–2 and the Czech Republic won the bronze medal over Russia 3–0. Three months later, Sweden won the 2006 World Championships and became the first team to win the Olympic and World Championship gold in the same year.

Qualification

Canada, Sweden, Slovakia, Czech Republic, Finland, United States, Russia and Germany qualified as the top eight teams in the IIHF World Ranking in 2004. Italy qualified as host team. The remaining three teams qualified from qualification tournaments.

Notes

Rosters

Preliminary round
All times are local (UTC+1).

Group A

Group B

Allegations have surfaced of Sweden throwing the game against Slovakia so the Swedes would face Switzerland in the quarterfinals instead of Canada or the Czech Republic. Shortly before the game, Sweden coach Bengt-Åke Gustafsson was reported to have publicly contemplated tanking in order to avoid those teams, saying about Canada and the Czechs, "One is cholera, the other the plague." During the game itself, one reportedly suspect sequence came when Sweden had an extended five-on-three powerplay with five NHL stars on the ice—Peter Forsberg, Mats Sundin, Daniel Alfredsson, Nicklas Lidström and Fredrik Modin—and failed to put a shot on net. Sports Illustrated writer Michael Farber would say about this particular powerplay, "If the Swedes had passed the puck any more, their next opponent would have been the Washington Generals." "[They] were even afraid to shoot!", Russian coach Vladimir Krikunov said.

As part of a subsequent interview about the championship over five years later, Forsberg was interpreted to insinuate that Sweden lost their preliminary round game against Slovakia on purpose, so as to draw Switzerland as their quarterfinal opponent, rather than Canada or the Czech Republic. Swedish forward Henrik Sedin, who played alongside Forsberg on the 2006 team denied the notion while adding that Forsberg's comments in the interview were misconstrued.

Playoff round

Bracket

Quarterfinals

Semifinals

Bronze medal game

Gold medal game

Final ranking

Statistics

Average age
Team USA was the oldest team in the tournament, averaging 31 years and 8 months. Team Germany was the youngest team in the tournament, averaging 26 years and 7 months. Gold medalists team Sweden averaged 29 years and 7 months. Tournament average was 29 years and 2 months.

Scoring leaders
List shows the top ten skaters sorted by points, then goals.

GP = Games played; G = Goals; A = Assists; Pts = Points; +/− = Plus-minus; PIM = Penalties in minutes; POS = Position
Source: IIHF

Leading goaltenders
Only the top five goaltenders, based on save percentage, who have played at least 40% of their team's minutes, are included in this list.
TOI = Time on Ice (minutes:seconds); SA = Shots against; GA = Goals against; GAA = Goals against average; Sv% = Save percentage; SO = ShutoutsSource: IIHF

Awards
Media All-Stars
Goaltender:  Antero Niittymäki
Defencemen:  Nicklas Lidström,  Kimmo Timonen
Forwards:  Saku Koivu,  Teemu Selänne,  Alexander Ovechkin
Source: IIHF
Most Valuable Player:  Antero Niittymäki
Best players selected by the directorate:
Best Goaltender:  Antero Niittymäki
Best Defenceman:  Kenny Jönsson
Best Forward:  Teemu Selänne
Source: IIHF

References

External links
 
 

 
Men's
Men's events at the 2006 Winter Olympics